The Asian Angel (Japanese: アジアの天使, Hepburn: Ajia no Tenshi) is a 2021 Japanese-South Korean film written and directed by Yuya Ishii and starring Sosuke Ikematsu and Choi Hee-seo. The storyline follows a Japanese man seeking a new life in South Korea. The film was shot exclusively in South Korea with Japanese and Korean actors, with the narrative crafted around the idea of overcoming cultural barriers to begin new chapters in life. Tsuyoshi, a single father and struggling novelist, ends up on the road with his brother and other drifters; as they navigate their differences and their futures, the group ultimately finds modes of deep connection despite cultural and language conflicts.

The Asian Angel premiered as the closing film of the 2021 Osaka Asian Film Festival. The film was selected to be screened at the 20th New York Asian Film Festival. Ikematsu, who plays the starring role, was also selected for one of the festival’s three Rising Star Asia Awards.

Plot 
Tsuyoshi, a widowed Japanese novelist, takes his young son Manabu to Seoul to work with Tsuyoshi’s older brother Toru. They discover that Toru is making a shady living by illegally exporting cosmetics. The situation worsens when Toru’s partner steals the profits and runs off. Toru suggests another avenue of profit, and the trio takes off to the countryside. They eventually meet Seol, a Korean singer whose music isn't selling and whose boss is pressuring her into an unwanted relationship. After Seol is suddenly dropped by her agency, she and her sister end up on the same train as the Japanese brothers, and they eventually end up traveling together. A subtle romance begins to bud between Tsuyoshi and Seol, complicated somewhat by cultural and communication barriers and the effects of the past. The story also has elements of the supernatural, with Tateto Serizawa playing the role of an angel in the film.

Cast 
 Sosuke Ikematsu as Tsuyoshi Aoki
 Choi Hee-seo as Choi Seol
 Joe Odagiri as Toru Aoki
 Kim Min-jae as Choi Jung-woo
  as Choi Bom
 Ryo Sato as Manabu Aoki
 Tateto Serizawa as the angel
 Ji Ja-hye as aunt
 Jang Hee-ryung as Tae-yeon
 Seo Dong-gab as Lee Dong-hee
 Park Jung-bum as Jung-mo

See also
 List of films about angels

References

External links
 
Official Website 

2021 films
2020s Japanese-language films
Japanese drama road movies
2020s Korean-language films
South Korean drama road movies
Films about angels
Films about siblings
Films about singers
Films about widowhood
Films about writers
Films directed by Yuya Ishii
Films set in Seoul
Films set in Gangwon Province, South Korea
Films shot in Seoul
Films shot in Gangwon Province, South Korea
2021 multilingual films
Japanese multilingual films
South Korean multilingual films